Vivian Motzfeldt is a Greenlandic politician who served as the Speaker of the Inatsisartut, the Parliament of Greenland, and the deputy chairwoman of Siumut. In the Kielsen V Cabinet, Motzfeldt served as the Minister of Education, Culture, Church and Foreign Affairs.

Early life and education
Vivian Motzfedlt was born on 10 June 1972. At seven years old, she moved to a school home in Qaqortoq. Each Christmas she and her siblings went back to their hometown of Upernaviarsuk, an experimental site for agriculture in southern Greenland. She spent Christmas at her childhood home until she was 17, when she went to the United States on an exchange study stay. She returned to Greenland to study to be a teacher in Nuuk. From 1998 to 2000, Motzfedlt attended the University of Greenland where she studied cultural and social history of Greenland. She then had a teaching career first in Nuuk until 2007, and then Qaqortoq from 2010 to 2014.

References

1972 births
Living people
Greenlandic politicians
Culture ministers of Greenland
Education ministers of Greenland
Religious affairs ministers of Greenland
Sports ministers of Greenland
Greenlandic women in politics